Savoie (Arpitan: Savouè or Savouè-d'Avâl; English: Savoy ) is a department in the Auvergne-Rhône-Alpes region, Southeastern France. Located in the French Alps, its prefecture is Chambéry. In 2019, Savoie had a population of 436,434.

Together with Haute-Savoie, it is one of the two departments of the historical region of Savoy; the Duchy of Savoy was annexed by France in 1860, following the signature of the Treaty of Turin. The area is known for its numerous ski resorts and contribution to French cuisine, with culinary specialities such as fondue savoyarde, tartiflette, génépi, as well as various sorts of saucisson.

History
It is widely accepted that Savoie takes its name from the Latin Sapaudia or Sabaudia, meaning land covered in fir trees. Savoie was long part of the states of Savoy; though beginning in the 16th century, it was occupied by France several times. It was integrated into the Mont-Blanc department from 1792 to 1815 (and partially into the Léman department from 1798 to 1814). The province was annexed by France in 1860. The former Duchy of Savoy became the two departments of Savoie and Haute-Savoie.

Moûtiers, capital of the former province of Tarentaise Valley (French: Vallée de la Tarentaise), ceased to be a subprefecture following a law that took effect on 10 September 1926.

Savoie hosted the 1992 Winter Olympics, based in Albertville with ski events at Tarentaise and Beaufortain. The coat of arms for Savoie was used as a pattern for the flames in the official emblem of the games.

The other main alpine valley is the Maurienne, connected to the Tarentaise  valley by two passes, the col de la Madeleine and the highest pass in Europe, the col de l'Iseran. The Maurienne valley was through the col du Mont Cenis, the major commercial route between France and Italy. It is one of the longest intra-alpine valleys in the Alps.

Geography
Savoie is part of the Auvergne-Rhône-Alpes region established on 1 January 2016. It was previously part of Rhône-Alpes. It borders the departments of Haute-Savoie, Ain, Isère and Hautes-Alpes in addition to the Aosta Valley and the Metropolitan City of Turin in Italy.

Much of Savoie is covered by mountains:
Mont Blanc Massif
Belledonne Massif
Lauzière massif
Aiguilles d'Arves Massif
Massif des Cerces
Aravis Range
Mont Cenis Massif
Bauges Massif
Chartreuse Massif
Vanoise Massif
Beaufortain Massif

The department is crossed by the Isère river, which has its source in the Iseran pass. Its two main lakes are Lac du Bourget (the largest and deepest lake entirely in France) and Lac d'Aiguebelette, one of the least polluted in France due to a 1976 law forbidding any use of motorboats on the lake.

Climate
Most of the department features an alpine climate or a subalpine climate. At lower altitudes and in the valleys, the climate is humid continental (Köppen: Dfb) or even oceanic in the frontcounrty and lake Bourget area (Köppen: Cfb), using the  isotherm.

Economy
According to the Chambéry chamber of commerce, close to 50% of the department's wealth comes from tourism. Each year, Savoie hosts over 30 million visitor-nights of tourists. Savoie also profits from its natural resources with particular strengths in ore processing and hydroelectric power.

Savoie had an exceptionally high export/import ratio of 214% in 2005. Its exports rose to €1.768 billion and €825 million in imports. Its leading exports were steel, aluminum, and electric and electronic components.

Agriculture
Savoie is famous for its cows, which produce numerous cheeses, some of them are:
Beaufort
Savoie gruyère
Reblochon
Abbaye de Tamié
Tome des Bauges
Tomme de Savoie

Numerous wine grapes are also grown in Savoie. The most famous wines are made of Gamay, Pinot noir and Mondeuse grapes. Fruit production is the third largest component of agriculture in Savoie.

Apples and pears are also produced in the region and are well known for their qualities.

Demographics

Residents of Savoie are known as Savoyards, though they can also be called Savoisiens (the historical name) or Savoyens.

Principal towns

The most populous commune is Chambéry, the prefecture. As of 2019, there are 8 communes with more than 7,000 inhabitants:

The "average" (see arithmetic mean) population density is not a good indicator: the valleys tend to be much more densely populated, whereas the mountains tend to be near-completely uninhabited.

Religion
The Catholic Church in Savoie is divided into three dioceses: Chambéry, Maurienne, and Tarentaise. Together, they form an archdiocese, in which the bishop of Chambéry is the archbishop.

Politics

Departmental Council of Savoie

The Departmental Council of Savoie has 38 seats. 30 councillors are part of the J'aime la Savoie ("I love Savoie") right-wing group; 8 councillors are part of the Savoie pour Tous ("Savoie for All") left-wing group. Hervé Gaymard (The Republicans) has been President of the Departmental Council since 2008. Thierry Repentin (Socialist Party) has been Opposition Leader since 1998.

Members of the National Assembly

Savoie elected the following members of the National Assembly during the 2017 legislative election:

Senators

Savoie is represented by two Senators in Parliament. Jean-Pierre Vial and Martine Berthet have served since 1995 and 2017 respectively. Both are members of The Republicans (LR).

Tourism
Tourism, which is quite important to Savoie, began to develop towards the end of the 19th century, mostly summer oriented. The increase in the popularity of skiing in the 20th century made Savoie home to the largest number of ski hills in France, including many famous ones:
Val-d'Isère
Tignes
Les Arcs
La Plagne
Courchevel
Méribel
Valmorel
Les Menuires
Val Thorens
Les Saisies
Savoie Grand Revard
Bramans
Bessans 
Valloire

Hydrotherapy, practised in the region since antiquity, is also quite developed. There are four locations that are still active:
Aix-les-Bains
Challes-les-Eaux
Brides-les-Bains
La Léchère

See also

History
Savoy, historical region
House of Savoy, ruling dynasty of Savoy from 1032 to 1860
Duchy of Savoy, rulers of Savoy region from 1416 to 1720
Kingdom of Sardinia, 1720 to 1860

Language
French language
Franco-Provençal language

Places
Communes of the Savoie department
Arrondissements of the Savoie department
Cantons of the Savoie department
Chambéry
Aix-les-Bains
Lac du Bourget, the largest lake in France

Wine
French wine, AOC wine of Savoie
Savoy wine or wine of Savoie Allobrogie

References

External links
 Departmental Council website
 Prefecture website
Regional Tourism Agency
Gallery Photos and pictures of Savoie
Photos of Savoie mountains

 
1860 establishments in France
Departments of Auvergne-Rhône-Alpes
States and territories established in 1860